Bigelow Aerospace is an American aeronautics and outer space technology company which manufactures and develops expandable space station modules. Bigelow Aerospace was founded by Robert Bigelow in 1998, and is based in North Las Vegas, Nevada. It is funded in large part by the profit Bigelow gained through his ownership of the hotel chain, Budget Suites of America.

By 2013, Bigelow had invested US$250 million in the company. Bigelow stated on a number of occasions that he was prepared to fund Bigelow Aerospace with about US$500 million through 2015 in order to achieve launch of full-scale hardware.

Bigelow Aerospace announced in 2010 that they intended to create a modular set of space habitats for creating or expanding space stations. The company built two unmanned free-flying prototypes that flew in 2006 and 2007 and a module attached to the International Space Station.

In March 2020, the company laid off all 88 of its employees due to the COVID-19 pandemic, and planned to rehire staff when conditions permitted.

History 

Bigelow originally licensed the multi-layer, expandable space module technology from NASA in 2000 after Congress canceled the International Space Station (ISS) TransHab project following delays and budget constraints in the late 1990s.

Bigelow has three Space Act agreements whereby Bigelow Aerospace is the sole commercializer of several of NASA's key expandable module technologies.

Bigelow continued to develop the technology for a decade, redesigning the module fabric layers – including adding proprietary extensions of Vectran shield fabric, "a double-strength variant of Kevlar" – and developing a family of uncrewed and crewed expandable spacecraft in a variety of sizes. Bigelow invested US$75 million in proprietary extensions to the NASA technology by mid-2006, and US$180 million into the technology by 2010.

By 2010, Robert Bigelow had invested US$180 million in the company, which by 2013 had grown to US$250 million of his personal fortune. Bigelow stated on multiple occasions that he was prepared to fund Bigelow Aerospace with up to about US$500 million through 2015 in order to achieve launch of full-scale hardware.

In early 2010, NASA came full circle to once again investigate "making inflatable space-station modules to make roomier, lighter, cheaper-to-launch spacecraft" by announcing plans in its budget proposal released 22 February 2010. NASA considered connecting a Bigelow expandable craft to the ISS for safety, life support, radiation shielding, thermal control and communications verification testing for the next three years", and in December 2012, signed a US$17.8 million contract with Bigelow to develop the Bigelow Expandable Activity Module (BEAM), then projected to fly in 2015. The module was berthed to the International Space Station on 16 April 2016, and was inflated on 28 May 2016.  it remains at the station.

Since early on, Bigelow has been intent on "pursuing markets for a variety of users including biotech and pharmaceutical companies and university research, entertainment applications and government military and civil users". The business model includes "'leasing out' small space stations or habitats made of one or more [B330] inflatable modules to different research communities or corporations". Despite these broad plans for space commercialization, the space tourism destination and space hotel monikers were frequently used by many media outlets following the 2006/2007 launches of Genesis I and Genesis II. Robert Bigelow has been explicit that he is aiming to do business in space in a new way, with "low cost and rapid turnaround, contrary to traditional NASA ISS and Space Shuttle operations and bureaucracy".

In October 2010, Bigelow announced that it had agreements with six sovereign nations to utilize on-orbit facilities of the commercial space station: UK Astronomy Technology Centre (United Kingdom), Netherlands Space Office (Netherlands), Defence South Australia (Australia), Singapore Government Technology Development Agency (Singapore), Japan Manned Space Systems Corporation, chairman is a previous director of JAXA (Japan) and Swedish National Space Board (Sweden). In February 2011, Dubai of the United Arab Emirates became the seventh nation to have signed on.

In 2011, Bigelow employed an in-house team of model makers, coming from the film and architecture industries, to make detailed models of their space habitats and space stations. Scale models were sent to "potential customers, including governments and corporations, as a reminder of the possibilities".

Reportedly due to delays in launch capability to transport humans to low Earth orbit, Bigelow dramatically reduced staff in late September 2011, because crew transportation would not become available until "years after the first B330 could be ready", laying off 40 of their 90 employees.

In late March 2012 Bigelow began increasing staff levels once again. By April 2013, Bigelow was saying that they would have B330 modules ready to go to space by the time that commercial passenger spacecraft were available to ferry their customers to the dual–BA330 Alpha space station – expected in 2017 – and that Bigelow was ready to enter into contracts with customers.

Further staff reductions occurred at the start of 2016, estimated by industry sources to be between 30 and 50 people of 150 employed at the time of the layoffs. This came after the company advertised more than 100 jobs in 2015 at both its North Las Vegas headquarters and its newly established propulsion department in Huntsville, Alabama. As part of its reduction in workforce, the company closed the Huntsville facility.

In February 2018, the company announced the formation of a new subsidiary, Bigelow Space Operations, to handle operational aspects of marketing and operating space stations in low Earth orbit.

In March 2020, the company laid off all of its employees, 88 in total.

NASA Lawsuit

On March 26, 2021, Bigelow Aerospace filed a lawsuit against NASA with the United States District Court for the District of Nevada. The lawsuit alleges that NASA still owes them $1.05 million “for work done developing and testing an expandable space module.” 

In December 2021, Bigelow transferred ownership of BEAM to NASA's Johnson Space Center.

Module design and business plans

Expandable module design overview 

Bigelow Aerospace anticipates that its inflatable modules will be more durable than rigid modules. This is partially due to the company's use of several layers of vectran, a material twice as strong as kevlar, and also because, in theory, flexible walls should be able to sustain micrometeoroid impacts better than rigid walls. In ground-based testing, micrometeoroids capable of puncturing standard ISS module materials penetrated only about halfway through the Bigelow skin. Operations director Mike Gold commented that Bigelow modules also wouldn't suffer from the same local shattering problems likely with metallic modules. This could provide as much as 24 hours to remedy punctures in comparison to the more serious results of standard ISS skin micrometeoroid damage.

Expected uses for Bigelow Aerospace's expandable modules include microgravity research and development and space manufacturing. Other potential uses include variable - gravity research — for gravity gradients above microgravity including Moon (0.16 g) and Mars (0.38 g) gravity research; space tourism — such as modules for orbital hotels; and space transportation — such as components in spaceships for Moon or Mars crewed missions.

Business plans 
 the Bigelow Aerospace website shows several pricing schemes including US$51.25 million for 60 days on a B330 space station. That price covers everything including transport, training, and consumables. For US$25 million Bigelow Aerospace customers can lease a third of a B330 habitat, roughly 110 cubic meters, for a period of 60 days.

In 2010, Bigelow proposed conceptual designs for expandable habitats that would be substantially larger than the B330, previously its largest at  habitat volume. Contingent on NASA going forward with a super heavy lifter, the proposed concept would include "expandable habitats offering 2,100 cubic meters [74,000 cubic feet] of volume — nearly twice the capacity available on the International Space Station", and another providing .

In 2010, Bigelow Aerospace began building a large production facility in North Las Vegas, Nevada to produce the space modules. The  facility will include three production lines for three distinct spacecraft, doubling the amount of floor space at Bigelow, and transitioning the focus from research and development, with an existing workforce of 115, to production. Bigelow expected to hire approximately 1,200 new employees to staff the plant, with production commencing in early 2012.

In 2013, during execution of the contract to build the Bigelow Expandable Activity Module for the International Space Station, Robert Bigelow indicated that his company manufactures about 50% of product content in-house, while subcontracting out the remainder.

In March 2013, Bigelow signed an agreement with NASA to act as "the central link between NASA and dozens of private companies that want to play a role in the creation of a new economy – a space economy, including proposals far more complex than mere space tourism: research, manufacturing, medicine and agriculture. The agreement calls for Bigelow to liaise between NASA and the private sector to see how the U.S. government and industry could help each other".

The first deliverable on that contract, a "report which identifies companies that want to be a part of this effort, as well as potential customers", was delivered by Bigelow to NASA in May 2013.

Modules 
On 12 July 2006, and 28 June 2007, Bigelow launched the Genesis I and II modules, respectively. In mid-2008, Bigelow Aerospace completed the Galaxy module but did not launch it due to rising launch costs and the ability to substantially validate the new Galaxy technologies terrestrially, particularly after the successful two Genesis launches in 2006 and 2007. It was tested on the ground at its North Las Vegas facility instead.

As of 2014, Bigelow had reserved a 2015 launch on SpaceX's Falcon 9 rocket, but did not announce the payload. The Falcon 9 would have been capable of launching a Sundancer module, but not a B330 module. Bigelow also talked with Lockheed Martin regarding potential launches on the Atlas V-401 launch vehicle. No launch took place in 2015, although in April 2016 Bigelow Aerospace remained on SpaceX's list of future launch customers. On 8 April 2016, the SpaceX CRS-8 mission launched BEAM to the ISS; on 11 April 2016, Bigelow and United Launch Alliance announced that an Atlas V-552 rocket had been booked for a flight in 2020 to deliver a B330 habitat to low-Earth orbit.

Note: Current as of July 2021. Dates of upcoming launches are proposed and are subject to change.

Expandable habitat modules

Genesis I 

On 12 July 2006, Genesis I launched on a Dnepr booster from Dombarovsky Cosmodrome in Orenburg Oblast, Russia. The launch was conducted by Bigelow and ISC Kosmotras. Despite ground-side difficulties during launch, the spacecraft performed as expected upon reaching orbit, inflating, deploying solar arrays and starting internal systems. The mission is planned to last for five years and include extensive observation of the craft's performance including testing packing/deployment procedures and resistance to radiation and space debris, among other space hazards and conditions. Mike Gold, corporate counsel for Bigelow Aerospace, stated in relation to this mission and the next, "Our motto at Bigelow Aerospace is 'fly early and often'. Regardless of the results of Genesis 1, we will launch a follow-up mission rapidly". , the vehicle remains in orbit.

Genesis II 

On 28 June 2007, Genesis II launched on another Dnepr (a converted SS-18 ICBM) from Dombarovsky Cosmodrome in Orenburg Oblast, Russia. Launched at 08:02 PDT, Genesis II was inserted into orbit at 08:16 PDT at an inclination of 64.0°.

Although Genesis I and Genesis II are identical in size and similar in appearance there are several notable differences. Firstly, Genesis I contains 13 video cameras whereas Genesis II contains 22. Secondly, Genesis II includes a suite of additional sensors and avionics that are not present in Genesis I.

The orbital life is estimated to be 12 years, with a gradually decaying orbit resulting in re-entry into Earth's atmosphere and burn-up expected. , the vehicle remains in orbit.

Fly your stuff program
Bigelow Aerospace ran a Fly Your Stuff program for the Genesis II launch. The cost to launch pictures or small items was around US$300. Bigelow photographed each item with internal cameras as the items floated inside the craft, displaying them on the company website.

The first image of the interior of Genesis II appeared on the company's website on 29 June 2007. Some of the pictures and other items placed aboard Genesis II as part of the Fly Your Stuff program are clearly visible. Another interior image, apparently taken with more of the spacecraft's internal lights activated, was posted on 2 July 2007. Articles from the Fly Your Stuff program are also visible in this image.

Test items, supplied by Bigelow Aerospace employees, were sent into orbit on Genesis I. No new images of items floating inside Genesis I have been released since shortly after the launch and initial activation of the spacecraft due to problems with a computer which controls several of the internal cameras.

Galaxy/Guardian

Sundancer 

The third planned Bigelow launch, Sundancer, was to be equipped with full life-support systems, attitude control, orbital maneuvering systems, and would have been capable of reboost and deorbit burns. Like the Genesis pathfinders, Sundancer's outer surface would have been compacted around its central core, with air expanding it to its full size after entering orbit. Unlike previous Bigelow craft, it was planned to have three observation windows. , SpaceX had been contracted to provide a Falcon 9 vehicle for launch of a Bigelow payload in 2011.

In July 2011, Bigelow announced that they will cease development on the Sundancer and instead focus their efforts on the B330.

Bigelow Expandable Activity Module for the ISS 

In December 2012, Bigelow began development work on the Bigelow Expandable Activity Module (BEAM) under a US$17.8 million NASA contract. After a number of delays, BEAM was transported to ISS arriving on 10 April 2016, inside the unpressurized cargo trunk of a SpaceX Dragon during the SpaceX CRS-8 cargo mission. The mission tested the BEAM module's structural integrity, leak rate, radiation dosage and temperature changes over a two-year-long mission. At the end of BEAM's mission, the module was planned to be removed from the ISS and burn up during reentry. In October 2017, it was announced that the module would stay attached to the ISS for at least three more years, with options for two further one-year extensions.

B330 

Previous names for the B330 were the BA 330 and the Nautilus.

Bigelow has partnered with United Launch Alliance with the goal of launching a B330 module to orbit in 2021, potentially as an addition to the International Space Station. The two companies have also proposed launching a B330 to low lunar orbit in 2022 to serve as a lunar depot. The first B330 launch was originally planned to be launched aboard an Atlas V launch vehicle, but ULA stated in October 2017 that its in-development Vulcan Centaur launch vehicle was the only launch vehicle available with the performance and fairing capacity to carry the module.

BA 2100 concept module 

The BA 2100, or Olympus module, is a concept module that would require a heavy-lift launcher and would place in orbit the complete infrastructure of a  habitat, over six times as large as the B330. The concept model shows  docking ports at both ends.

First Base 
In June 2019, Bigelow Aerospace introduced the "First Base" concept. First Base is a  lunar station module that can accommodate four people; it features four airlocks and two warehouses with solar arrays on top.

Delays in launch capability 
As a result of delays in launch capability to transport humans to the Bigelow habitats, Bigelow "laid off some 40 of its 90 employees" in late September 2011. Bigelow had expected human launch capability by 2014 or 2015 but "the prospect of domestic crew transportation of any kind is apparently going to occur years after the first B330 could be ready. ... For both business and technical reasons, we cannot deploy a B330 without a means of transporting crew to and from our station, and the adjustment to our employment levels was necessary to reflect this reality".

Bigelow Commercial Space Station 

The Bigelow Next-Generation Commercial Space Station is a private orbital space complex currently under development by Bigelow. The space station will include both Sundancer and B330 expandable spacecraft modules and a central docking node, propulsion, solar arrays, and attached crew capsules. Initial launch of space station components was planned for 2014, with portions of the station available for leased use as early as 2015. Bigelow has publicly shown space station design configurations with up to nine B330 modules containing  of habitable space. Bigelow began to publicly refer to the initial configuration — two Sundancer modules and one B330 module — of the first Bigelow station as "Space Complex Alpha" in October 2010.

A second orbital station, Space Complex Bravo, was scheduled to begin launches in 2016.

Launches will not commence until there are commercial crew transportation systems operational, which will be 2017 or later.

Bigelow announced in October 2010 that it has agreements with six sovereign nations to utilize on-orbit facilities of the commercial space station: United Kingdom, Netherlands, Australia, Singapore, Japan and Sweden. By February 2011, this number had risen to seven.

An earlier space station, CSS Skywalker (Commercial Space Station Skywalker), was Bigelow's 2005 concept for the first space hotel. The Skywalker was to be composed of multiple Nautilus habitat modules, which would be expanded and connected upon reaching orbit. An MDPM (Multi-Directional Propulsion Module) would allow the Skywalker to be moved into interplanetary or lunar trajectories.

In November 2010, Bigelow indicated that the company would like to construct ten or more space stations and that there is a substantial commercial market to support such growth.

Crew and passenger transport 
Bigelow's business model requires a means of transporting humans to and from low Earth orbit. In 2004, Bigelow established and funded a US$50 million prize, America's Space Prize, to stimulate development of crewed vehicles. The prize expired without a winner in early 2010.

In August 2009, Bigelow Aerospace announced the development of the Orion Lite spacecraft, intended to be a lower cost, and less capable version of the Orion spacecraft under development by NASA. The intention would be for Orion Lite to provide access to low earth orbit using either the Atlas V or Falcon 9 launch systems, and carrying a crew of up to 7.

At the time Bigelow Aerospace's corporate counsel Mike Gold said: "...we would be foolish to depend completely on one capsule provider or any single launch system", ... "Therefore, it is vital from both a practical and business perspective to ensure that SpaceX and Dragon aren't the only options available to us, hence the need for another capsule".

, Bigelow was pursuing both launch options of Boeing CST-100 / ULA Atlas V and SpaceX Dragon / Falcon 9 as capsules and launchers. "Bigelow offers Boeing, SpaceX, and other vehicle developers ... the promise of a sustained, large market for space transportation services". With the initial Space Complex Alpha space station, Bigelow "would need six flights a year; with the launch of a second, larger station, that number would grow to 24, or two a month".

Bigelow entered NASA's Commercial Crew Program (CCP) with the Starliner capsule in collaboration with Boeing. Bigelow worked with Boeing to refine requirements for Starliner, including joint tests in August 2012. Separately, in May 2012, Bigelow and SpaceX teamed up towards joint marketing to international customers of crew transport to the Bigelow B330 space facility.

Aspirations beyond Earth-orbit 
In February 2010, following the announcement of NASA's post-Augustine Commission plans to reorient human-to-orbit plans more in the direction of commercial launch providers, Robert Bigelow said "We as a company have lunar ambitions, ... and we also have Mars ambitions as well". In April 2010, Bigelow suggested positioning a space station at the Lagrange point . He also said his proposed private Moon Base would consist of three B330s.

In March 2013, Bigelow signed a contract with NASA to "look at ways for private ventures to contribute to human exploration missions, perhaps including construction of a moon base" and to act as a clearinghouse with other commercial companies to extend commercial activity at conceptual lunar expeditionary bases in ways that are not a mainline part of NASA's current focus for human spaceflight, which is asteroid exploration missions.
The Bigelow report released later in 2013 identified "an uncertain regulatory environment as a major obstacle to commercial activities" on the Moon.

In December 2014, the FAA Office of Commercial Space Transportation (AST) completed a review of the proposed Bigelow lunar habitat, and indicated that "it was willing to use its authority to ensure Bigelow could carry out its [lunar] activities  ... without interference from other [U.S.] companies licensed by the FAA" [and that the FAA would] use its launch licensing authority, as best it can, to protect private sector assets on the Moon and to provide a safe environment for companies to conduct peaceful commercial activities without fear of harmful interference from other AST licensees".

Honors 
Bigelow Aerospace has received several honors for its spaceflight efforts. On 3 October 2006, Bigelow Aerospace received the Innovator Award from the Arthur C. Clarke Foundation. The award recognizes "initiatives or new inventions that have had recent impact on or hold particular promise for satellite communications and society, and stand as distinguished examples of innovative thinking".  Robert Bigelow was presented the award at the Arthur C. Clarke Awards in Washington, D.C. alongside Walter Cronkite, who was honored on the same night with the Arthur C. Clarke Lifetime Achievement Award.

On 26 January 2007, the Space Foundation announced that Bigelow Aerospace would be the recipient of its 2007 Space Achievement Award. Bigelow Aerospace joins a list of previous winners that include the Titan Launch Vehicle team; The Inertial Upper Stage team, the SpaceShipOne team; the Arianespace-CNES Ariane 4 launch team; the Evolved Expendable Launch Vehicle (EELV) teams; the NASA/Industry Galileo space probe team; the Hubble Space Telescope team; Sea Launch; and the NASA/Boeing International Space Station team. The award was presented to Robert Bigelow on 9 April 2007 at the 23rd National Space Symposium in Colorado Springs, Colorado.

See also 

 Axiom Space
 Blue Origin
 List of private spaceflight companies
 Space Adventures
 Space architecture

References

Further reading

External links 
 

 
1999 establishments in Nevada
Aerospace companies of the United States
Companies based in North Las Vegas, Nevada
Private spaceflight companies
Privately held companies based in the Las Vegas Valley
Space tourism
Transport companies established in 1999